The 2014–15 SIJHL season is the 14th season of the Superior International Junior Hockey League (SIJHL). The five teams of the SIJHL will play 56-game schedules.

Come February, the top teams of the league will play down for the Bill Salonen Cup, the SIJHL championship.  The winner of the Bill Salonen Cup will compete in the Central Canadian Junior "A" championship, the Dudley Hewitt Cup.  If successful against the winners of the Ontario Junior Hockey League and Northern Ontario Junior Hockey League, the champion would then move on to play in the Canadian Junior Hockey League championship, the 2015 Royal Bank Cup.

Changes 
Wisconsin Wilderness fold due to lack of arena.

Final standings
Note: GP = Games played; W = Wins; L = Losses; OTL = Overtime losses; SL = Shootout losses; GF = Goals for; GA = Goals against; PTS = Points; x = clinched playoff berth; y = clinched division title; z = clinched conference title

Teams listed on the official league website.

Standings listed on official league website.

2015 Bill Salonen Cup Playoffs

Playoff results are listed on the official league website.

Dudley Hewitt Cup Championship
Hosted by the Fort Frances Lakers in Fort Frances, Ontario.

2015 Royal Bank Cup Championship
Hosted by the Portage Terriers in Portage la Prairie, Manitoba.

Scoring leaders 
Note: GP = Games played; G = Goals; A = Assists; Pts = Points; PIM = Penalty minutes

Leading goaltenders 
Note: GP = Games played; Mins = Minutes played; W = Wins; L = Losses: OTL = Overtime losses; SL = Shootout losses; GA = Goals Allowed; SO = Shutouts; GAA = Goals against average

Players selected in 2015 NHL Entry Draft
To be decided after season concludes.

Awards
To be decided after season concludes.

See also 
 2015 Royal Bank Cup
 Dudley Hewitt Cup
 Ontario Junior Hockey League
 Northern Ontario Junior Hockey League
 Greater Ontario Junior Hockey League
 2014 in ice hockey
 2015 in ice hockey

References

External links 
 Official website of the Superior International Junior Hockey League
 Official website of the Canadian Junior Hockey League

Superior International Junior Hockey League seasons
SIJHL
SIJHL